Joanne Burns (born 5 December 1945 ) is a contemporary Australian poet and prose writer, with a strong emphasis on performance in her work.

Biography

Joanne Burns grew up and lives in Sydney. She studied at the University of Sydney and has taught English and creative writing at secondary and tertiary levels in Australia and England. Her work hovers between poetry and prose, and often incorporates 'found writing' from newspapers and other everyday sources. In the 1980s she participated in the experimental writing group Sydney Women Writers' Workshop. She has published ten collections of poetry, with Footnotes of a hammock sharing the 2005 Judith Wright Award for a collection of poetry.

Bibliography

Poetry

Critical studies and reviews
 Review of Amphora.
 review of 'Footnotes of a Hammock', by Gig Ryan, The Age, 16 October 2004 *
 Pushing Boundaries: Mark Roberts reviews amphora by joanne burns, Rochford Street Review, March 2013 *
 Surreal Inventiveness: Peter Kirkpatrick launches ‘brush’ by joanne burns, Rochford Street Review, November 2014 *

References

External links
Joanne Burns Content Page Poems & essays at Australian Literature Resources
Market Forces  Poem at Tinfish Magazine
Johnny Come Lately Poem with German translation
nightmarketing Poem at Haiku Review
rules for poems (involuntary collaborations) at magicdog.com

References
Adelaide, Debra (1988) Australian women writers: a bibliographic guide, London, Pandora

1945 births
Australian women poets
Living people
Writers from Sydney